Timofey Lunev (6 February 1926 – 1987) was a Belarusian hurdler. He competed in the men's 400 metres hurdles at the 1952 Summer Olympics, representing the Soviet Union.

References

1926 births
1987 deaths
Athletes (track and field) at the 1952 Summer Olympics
Belarusian male hurdlers
Soviet male hurdlers
Olympic athletes of the Soviet Union
Place of birth missing